In re Ah Yup was an 1878 landmark court decision in the United States that deemed residents of Asian descent ineligible for naturalization. Since the existing laws allowed only for the naturalization of white people and black people, the Chinese plaintiff Ah Yup attempted to argue that Chinese people were white. A federal court in California dismissed this contention with reference to then current pseudoscientific and popular ideas about race, emphasizing that "Orientals" were unfit for participation in republican government because of the unsatisfactory political culture which existed in Asia at the time.

Case classification
Prerequisite cases were cases based on racial restrictions on naturalization. The first reported prerequisite case was handed down in 1878. From 1878 until the end of racial restrictions on naturalization in 1952, fifty-one more prerequisite cases were decided in jurisdictions around the country, all the way from California to Washington D.C. All of these had to do with applicants from a variety of countries including, Canada, Mexico, Japan, the Philippines, India, and Syria. Almost all of these cases were instances where the applicants presented claims of white racial identity.

Ah Yup was the first prerequisite case. This case gave a sense of what to expect in future cases, as well as the reasoning that reflected almost every other prerequisite case that would be presented in the United States.

History
Ah Yup was an ethnically Chinese immigrant who applied for naturalization. The petition stated that all of the qualifications required by the statute to entitle the petitioner to be naturalized were present, as long as the statute authorized the naturalization of a native of China of the "Mongolian race" (a term used at the time to include people from most Asian ethnic groups). The question then being posed by this case was, 'is a person of the Mongolian race a "white person" within the meaning of the statute?'

On April 29, 1878, the Ninth Circuit Court in California denied Ah Yup the right to naturalize. The court did this by citing the 1802 naturalization laws and all revised statutes that had been passed since. At the time of Ah Yup's petition, the laws granted all "free white persons" as well as all "aliens of African nativity, and persons of African descent" the right to naturalize. The court ruled that Mongolians could not be classified as "white", and made it clear that the existing provisions prevented all except "whites" and those of African descent from naturalizing to the United States.

Decision
Circuit Judge Lorenzo Sawyer presided over this case. He noted that this case constituted the first naturalization application by a person from China. Sawyer turned to evidence coming from science and that of amici curiae to assist the court in a decision. The evidence coming from science was based on contemporary anthropological thought on racial classifications. Judge Sawyer diligently reviewed the legislative history of the naturalization statute. He not only wanted to rely on the opinions of the amici, but also the scientific evidence as he  searched for a clue to the meaning of the question of Chinese naturalization.

The judge carefully examined congressional debates that came about because of Senator Charles Sumner's opposition to racial restrictions. These debates directly dealt with and questioned Chinese naturalization. After careful consideration, Sawyer decided that he was "of the opinion that a native of China, of the Mongolian race, is not a white person" and due to this Ah Yup was denied citizenship to the United States of America.

References

Chinese-American history
United States immigration and naturalization case law
1878 in United States case law
United States circuit court cases
Race and law in the United States
Asian-American history of California
1878 in California